Havre may refer to:

Places
Canada
 Havre-Aubert, Magdalen Islands, Quebec
 Havre Boucher, Nova Scotia
 Havre-Saint-Pierre, Quebec

USA
 Havre de Grace, Maryland
 Havre De Grace High School
 Havre, Michigan
 Havre, Montana
 Havre Air Force Station
 Havre City–County Airport

France
 Havre–Caumartin (Paris Métro), Paris, France
 Le Havre, France, often called Havre in English

Elsewhere
 Havré, Belgium
 Havrå (Havre), Norway
 Havre Seamount, Kermadec Islands, New Zealand

Other
 Havre de Grace (horse)

See also
 Le Havre (disambiguation)
Harve

ru:Гавр (значения)